Seng Heng Engineering is a small and medium enterprise in Singapore, providing fasteners, turnkey machining and corrosion resistant coating products globally.

History

In 1940, Seng Heng Engineering started as Seng Heng Iron Works producing bolts and nuts in Chinatown, Singapore. It was founded by Lau Kum Kuan.

In 1956, the company moved to Geylang, taking up a land area of 1000 sq ft and changed its name to Seng Heng Engineering Contractor. It started fabrication of iron grilled gate.

In 1979, Seng Heng moved to Eunos and expanded to 27,000 sq ft and changed it names again to Seng Heng Engineering Pte Ltd.

In 2008, Seng Heng bought a Woodlands factory to expand its operations.

In 2012, Seng Heng moved to Joo Koon Circle with a land area of 120,000 sq ft.

Since 2013, Seng Heng located at Joo Koon Circle, with a land area of 120,000 square feet is managed by Mr Jeffrey Lau, the Chairman and Mr Jackie Lau, the managing director of the company.

Products
Seng Heng Engineering provides products and services to a wide range of industries such as Refineries and Petrochemical Plants, LNG Plants, Power Plants, Gas and Steam Turbine, Heavy Civil Construction, Offshore Platform, FPSO and Subsea (API 20E).

In 1989, Seng Heng Engineering through the Singapore Institute of Standards and Industrial Research (SISIR) sought help from foreign experts to develop corrosion resistance coating and have enabled the company to break through the international market. Below are the current different types of coatings that Seng Heng Engineering offers:

References

Engineering companies of Singapore